Gordon Cameron Jackson,  (19 December 1923 – 15 January 1990) was a Scottish actor best remembered for his roles as the butler Angus Hudson in Upstairs, Downstairs and as George Cowley, the head of CI5, in The Professionals. He also portrayed Capt Jimmy Cairns in Tunes of Glory, and Flt. Lt. Andrew MacDonald, "Intelligence", in The Great Escape.

Early life
Gordon Jackson was born in Glasgow in 1923, the youngest of five children. He attended Hillhead High School, and in his youth he took part in BBC radio shows including Children's Hour. He left school aged 15 and became a draughtsman for Rolls-Royce.

Early career
His film career began in 1942, when producers from Ealing Studios were looking for a young Scot to act in The Foreman Went to France and he was suggested for the part. After this, he returned to his job at Rolls-Royce, but he was soon asked to do more films, and he decided to make acting his career. Jackson soon appeared in other films, including Millions Like Us, San Demetrio London, The Captive Heart, Eureka Stockade and Whisky Galore!. In the early years of his career, Jackson also worked in repertory theatre in Glasgow, Worthing and Perth.

In 1949, he starred in the film Floodtide, along with actress Rona Anderson. He and Anderson married two years later on 2 June 1951. They had two sons, Graham and Roddy. The same year, he made his London stage debut, appearing in the play Seagulls Over Sorrento by Hugh Hastings.

In the 1950s and 1960s he appeared on television in programmes such as The Adventures of Robin Hood, ABC of Britain, Gideon's Way and The Avengers. In 1955 he had a small part in The Quatermass Xperiment, the film version of the BBC TV serial. He later had supporting roles in the films The Great Escape, The Bridal Path and The Ipcress File. In 1969, he and his wife had important roles in The Prime of Miss Jean Brodie. That year, he played Horatio in Tony Richardson's production of Hamlet and he won a Clarence Derwent Award for Best Supporting Actor, having also taken part in the film version.

Later career
Gordon Jackson became a household name playing the stern Scottish butler Angus Hudson in sixty episodes of the period drama Upstairs, Downstairs from 1971 to 1975. In 1976, he won an Emmy Award for Outstanding Single Performance by a Supporting Actor for the episode "The Beastly Hun". In 1974, he was named British Actor of the Year and in 1979 he was made an OBE. Jackson was cast opposite Bette Davis for the American television film Madame Sin (1972), which was released in overseas markets as a feature film.

His next big television role was in the hard-hitting police drama The Professionals from 1977. He played George Cowley in all 57 episodes of the programme, which ended in 1983, although filming finished in 1981. He played Noel Strachan in the Australian Second World War drama A Town Like Alice (1981), winning a Logie Award for his performance.

After A Town Like Alice and The Professionals, Gordon Jackson continued his television work with appearances in Hart to Hart, Campion and Shaka Zulu and the films The Shooting Party and The Whistle Blower. He also appeared in the theatre, appearing in Cards on the Table, adapted from the novel by Agatha Christie at the Vaudeville Theatre in 1981 and in Mass Appeal by Bill C. Davis at the Lyric Hammersmith in 1982. From 1985 to 1986, Jackson narrated two afternoon cookery shows in New Zealand for TVNZ called Fresh and Fancy Fare and its successor Country Fare. His last role before his death was in Effie's Burning, and this was broadcast posthumously.

Death
In December 1989, he was diagnosed with bone cancer; he died on 15 January 1990, aged 66, in London. He was cremated at Golders Green Crematorium.

Selected filmography

 One of Our Aircraft Is Missing (1942) (uncredited)
 The Foreman Went to France (1942) as Alastair "Jock" MacFarlane
 Women Aren't Angels (1943) as Man in small orchestra
 Nine Men (1943) as the Young 'un
 Millions Like Us (1943) as Fred
 San Demetrio London (1943) as Messboy John Jamieson
 Pink String and Sealing Wax (1945) as David
 The Captive Heart (1946) as Lieut. Lennox
 Against the Wind (1948) as Duncan
 Eureka Stockade (1949) as Tom Kennedy
 Floodtide (1949) as David Shields
 Stop Press Girl (1949) as Jock Melville
 Whisky Galore! (1949) as George Campbell
 Bitter Springs (1950) as Mac
 Happy Go Lovely (1951) as Paul Tracy
 The Lady with a Lamp (1951)
 Castle in the Air (1951) as Hiker
 Death Goes to School (1953) as Detective Inspector Campbell
 Seagulls Over Sorrento (1953, TV Movie) as Able-Seaman Haggis Mcintosh 
 Malta Story (1953) as British Soldier (uncredited)
 Meet Mr. Lucifer (1953) as Hector
 The Love Lottery (1954) as Ralph
 The Delavine Affair (1955) as Florian
 Passage Home (1955) as Ted Burns
 The Quatermass Xperiment (1955) as BBC TV producer
 Windfall (1955) as Leonard
 Moby Dick—Rehearsed (1955 TV film) as A Young Actor / Ishmael
 Women Without Men (1956) as Percy
 Blonde Bait (1956) as Percy (re-edited version of Women Without Men, with new scenes and actors and plot differences)
 Pacific Destiny (1956) as District Officer
 The Baby and the Battleship (1956) as Harry
 Sailor Beware! (1956) as Carnoustie Bligh
 Seven Waves Away (1957) as John Merritt
 Let's Be Happy (1957) as Dougal MacLean 
 Hell Drivers (1957) as Scottie
 The Hasty Heart (1957 TV film) as Lachlen McLachlen
 Man in the Shadow (1957) as Jimmy Norris
 Blind Spot (1958) as "Chalky" White
 Yesterday's Enemy (1958, TV Movie) as Sgt. Ian McKenzie (reprised role in 1959 movie)
 Rockets Galore! (1958) as George Campbell
 The Navy Lark (1959) as Leading Seaman Johnson 
 Three Crooked Men (1959) as Don Wescott
 Meeting at Night (1959 TV film) as Hector Maclachlan
 Yesterday's Enemy (1959) as Sgt. McKenzie
 The Bridal Path (1959) as PC Alec
 Blind Date (1959) as Sergeant
 Devil's Bait (1959) as Sergeant Malcolm
 Never Die (1959, TV Movie) as Ian "Jock" Bell
 The Price of Silence (1960) as Roger Fenton
 Cone of Silence (1960) as Capt. Jock Bateson
 The Soldier's Tale (1960 TV film) as The Narrator
 Tunes of Glory (1960) as Capt. Jimmy Cairns, M.C.
 Snowball (1960) as Bill Donovan
 Greyfriars Bobby: The True Story of a Dog (1961) as Farmer
 Two Wives at One Wedding (1961) as Tom
 Mutiny on the Bounty (1962) as Seaman Edward Birkett
 Hold My Hand, Soldier (1963, TV Movie)
 The Great Escape (1963) as Flt. Lt. Andrew MacDonald, "Intelligence"
 The Long Ships (1964) as Vahlin
 Benbow Was His Name (1964, TV Movie) as Campbell
 Daylight Robbery (1964) as Sergeant
 The Ipcress File (1965) as Jock Carswell
 Operation Crossbow (1965) as R.A.F. Pilot (scenes deleted)
 Those Magnificent Men in Their Flying Machines (1965) as MacDougal
 Cast a Giant Shadow (1966) as James MacAfee
 The Fighting Prince of Donegal (1966) as Captain Leeds
 Triple Cross (1966) as British Sergeant Questioning Chapman (uncredited)
 The Night of the Generals (1967) as Captain Engel
 Danger Route (1967) as Brian Stern
 The Prime of Miss Jean Brodie (1969) as Gordon Lowther
 Run Wild, Run Free (1969) as Mr Ransome
 Hamlet (1969) as Horatio
 The Great Inimitable Mr. Dickens (1970, TV Movie) as The Narrator
 Scrooge (1970) as Tom – Friend of Harry's
 Kidnapped (1971) as Charles Stewart
 On the Run (1971) as Mr. Mallory
 Madame Sin (1972) as Commander Cavendish
 Russian Roulette (1975) as Hardison
 Sonntagsgeschichten (1976, TV Movie) as Mr. Dunner
 Spectre (1977, TV Movie) as Inspector Cabell
 Golden Rendezvous (1977) as Dr. Marston
 The Medusa Touch (1978) as Dr. Johnson
 The Last Giraffe (1979, TV Movie) as Fielding
 The Masks of Death (1984, TV Movie) as Alec MacDonald
 The Zaz (1985) as The Commander
 The Shooting Party (1985) as Tom Harker
 The Whistle Blower (1986) as Bruce
 Gunpowder (1986) as Sir Anthony Phelps
 The Lady and the Highwayman (1989, TV Movie) as Harry

Television credits
Note: TV films are listed in the filmography.
 The Avengers (1965 episode "Castle De'ath") as Ian De'ath
 Casting the Runes (1968 TV film) as Gayton
 Upstairs, Downstairs (1971–1975 TV series) as Hudson
 The Professionals (1977–1983 TV series) as George Cowley
 A Town Like Alice (1981 TV miniseries) as Noel Strachan
 Hart to Hart (1983 TV series) as Sir William Belgrave
 My Brother Tom (1986 TV miniseries) as Lockie McGibbon
 Shaka Zulu (1986–1989 TV series) as Prof. Bramston
 Noble House (1989 TV miniseries) as Supt. Armstrong
 Campion (1989 TV series) as Professor Gardner Cairey

References

External links

1923 births
1990 deaths
20th-century Scottish male actors
Clarence Derwent Award winners
Deaths from bone cancer
Deaths from cancer in England
Emmy Award winners
Logie Award winners
Male actors from Glasgow
Officers of the Order of the British Empire
People educated at Hillhead High School
Scottish male film actors
Scottish male radio actors
Scottish male stage actors
Scottish male television actors